Rosenfeld or Rosenfeldt is a former provincial electoral division in Manitoba, Canada. It was located in Rosenfeld, Manitoba. The district was first appeared in the 1888 election and lasted until 1903 when the riding was re-distributed into Rhineland.

Provincial representatives to the Legislative Assembly of Manitoba

Former provincial electoral districts of Manitoba